Talaat Dahshan (born 7 June 1943) is an Egyptian boxer. He competed in the men's heavyweight event at the 1968 Summer Olympics.

References

1943 births
Living people
Egyptian male boxers
Olympic boxers of Egypt
Boxers at the 1968 Summer Olympics
Sportspeople from Cairo
Heavyweight boxers
20th-century Egyptian people